The following lists events that happened in 1962 in Iceland.

Incumbents
President – Ásgeir Ásgeirsson
Prime Minister – Ólafur Thors

Events

Births

22 April – Sigurður Ingi Jóhannsson, politician, Prime Minister of Iceland
25 June – Kristinn Hrafnsson, journalist
24 July – Sigga, singer
10 August – Siv Friðleifsdóttir, politician.
10 August – Ragna Sigurðardóttir, writer and artist
26 September – Ólafur Jóhann Ólafsson, writer
2 October – Sigtryggur Baldursson, drummer and singer
29 October – Einar Örn Benediktsson, musician

Full date missing
Elínborg Halldórsdóttir, musician and painter

Deaths

References

 
1960s in Iceland
Iceland
Iceland
Years of the 20th century in Iceland